James Post may refer to:

James D. Post (1863–1921), U.S. Representative from Ohio
James E. Post, professor in management at Boston University
James N. Post III, American military officer
James F. Post (1818–1899), architect, builder, and contractor